Kerk or KERK may refer to:

 Kerk (surname)
 , US Navy cargo ship (code letters: KERK)

Places in Iran
Also rendered as Korak:
 Kerk, Hamadan
 Kerk, Kerman
 Kerk, Markazi
 Korak, Semnan

See also
 
 Groote Kerk (disambiguation)
 Grote Kerk (disambiguation)
 Nieuwe Kerk (disambiguation)
 Oude Kerk (disambiguation)